Sean Carey may refer to:

 Sean Carey (Gaelic footballer), Gaelic footballer from Co Tipperary
 S. Carey, drummer and supporting vocalist of indie folk band Bon Iver
 Sean Carey, a guitarist for Australian pop-rock band Thirsty Merc

See also
Sean Cary, Australia cricketer
Shaun Carey, English footballer